Valérien Alexandre Ismaël (born 28 September 1975) is a professional football coach and a former professional player who most recently managed Turkish club Beşiktaş.

During his playing career, Ismaël played for Racing Strasbourg, Crystal Palace, RC Lens, Werder Bremen, Bayern Munich, and Hannover 96. As a player, he won the Coupe de France, the Coupe de la Ligue twice, the Bundesliga twice, as well as the DFB-Pokal on two occasions. Following his retirement, he moved into management, first as a reserve coach for a number of clubs before moving into senior management at 1. FC Nürnberg, then with VfL Wolfsburg before a notable spell with LASK of the Austrian Bundesliga and spells with Barnsley and West Bromwich Albion of the English Championship.

Early years
Ismaël was born to a Guadeloupean father and an Alsatian mother, growing up in Strasbourg on the border with Germany. Ismaël's grandfather is German.

Playing career

Strasbourg
Ismaël made his debut for Strasbourg against Cannes on 15 January 1994. He went on to make 77 league appearances in his first spell with the club. Additionally, he appeared in five UEFA Cup matches, scoring once.

Crystal Palace
Ismaël was signed by Crystal Palace for £2.75 million from Strasbourg in January 1998, making him the most expensive player in the club's history. Despite this, he only played 13 games for the London club and was only there for ten months from January to October 1998, before moving back to his native France to sign for Lens in October 1998.

Lens
Ismaël's time at Lens saw him regain his form after his brief and expensive spell in England. He played 83 times, scoring five goals. He also had a short loan spell at his old club Strasbourg during the 2000–01 Division 1 season but could not help them avoid relegation. He did however play for Strasbourg in the 2001 Coupe de France Final, in which they beat Amiens on penalties. He returned to Lens for the 2001–02 Division 1 season where he was in particularly good form, playing 33 times and scoring on four occasions. However, he was sold back to Strasbourg for the following season following their promotion back to the top tier.

Back to Strasbourg
On moving back to his former club for a third spell, Ismaël was appointed captain. He led the club to a respectable 13th position and attracted interest from Europe because of his composed performances in defence. In his last spell at Strasbourg he made 26 appearances and scored twice. He appeared for his home club a total of 167 times in all competitions and netted seven goals.

Werder Bremen
Ismaël was loaned to Werder Bremen in 2003 where he appeared 32 times, scoring four goals. Bremen went on to win the German double in his first season at the club. He was sold to Werder prior to the following season, where once again he appeared 32 times, scoring four goals. However, Werder could only finish third. He made seven appearances in the UEFA Champions League as well, scoring twice.

Bayern Munich

Ismaël arrived at Bayern Munich in July 2005. He received a red card on his debut for the club, but finished the season winning the German league and cup double for the second time in his career. However, he only featured once in the 2006–07 campaign for the club due to his long term injury and was eventually released to join Hannover 96 in January 2008. He made 31 league appearances for Bayern without scoring and eight Champions league appearances, scoring once against A.C. Milan in a 4–1 loss.

Hannover 96
Ismaël was brought to the club in order to strengthen the struggling defence and to provide leadership for his new teammates. His first game for Hannover was against his previous club, Bayern, playing well for 45 minutes and helping his team maintain a 0–0. After he was substituted with a minor injury, Hannover conceded three goals in the second half. After overcoming the injury, he became a key player for the team. Due to further injuries and a bad prognosis for recovery he retired on 5 October 2009. In total he made 18 appearances for Hannover.

International career
Ismaël had appearances for French under-18 and under-21 teams. When he was not called up to the senior team, he wanted to represent Germany. However, he was rejected by the German Football Association (DFB) because there was not enough connection to Germany. Answering questions of the German sports magazine Kicker, Ismael said the report that was published by the German tabloid Bild, the following: "That's not quite true. I am French, and I still hope for my chance to play for France. I'm feeling fine in Germany, but I do not want to volunteer. Only if Klinsmann wants me, then we would have to talk about it." If former Germany coach Jürgen Klinsmann was interested in him, Ismaël wanted to check his ancestry.

Gernot Rohr, an expert of French football, explained the permanent non-consideration of Ismaël: "Although Valérien was a U-21 international, he was never an option for the senior team. Of course Valérien is one of the better centre-backs, but he was never so striking that he could compete with the first-team regulars." Ismaël saw it differently: "There used to be big names, okay. But today, I am no worse than those who are there." After Ismaël offered his services in October 2005 again to the German national team, he received again a rejection. Later in March 2006, the German Football Association announced that Ismaël was not eligible to play for Germany because he had played a U-21 European Championship qualifier for France in August 1996. According to FIFA rules, he would have needed German citizenship already back in 1996 to switch now.

It was reported that Togo also wanted to call up Ismaël to their squad for the 2006 FIFA World Cup, given his former wife is partially Togolese descent, but he denied the approach and interest in the offer.

Managerial career

Hannover 96
On 10 October 2009, Ismaël became the assistant general manager of Hannover 96. From 24 June 2010, he was also board member of the club. On 28 November 2011, he took over the job of manager of the second team, Hannover 96 II. In the 2011–12 season, Hannover II finished in sixth place with a record of 14 wins, eight draws, and 12 losses. During the 2012–13 season, Hannover II finished in fourth place with a record of 16 wins, six draws, and eight losses. Ismaël left on 30 June 2013.

VfL Wolfsburg II
Ismaël was manager of VfL Wolfsburg II between 1 July 2013 and 5 June 2014. Wolfsburg II won the Regionalliga Nord in the 2013–14 season and lost to Sonnenhof Großaspach in the promotion play-off.

1. FC Nürnberg

Ismaël became the new head coach of 1. FC Nürnberg on 5 June 2014 and won his first match in charge against Erzgebirge Aue 1–0 on 3 August 2014. He went on to lose eight of his next 13 matches and was sacked on 10 November 2014; three days after a 2–1 loss to SV Sandhausen. He finished with a record of four wins, two draws, and eight losses.

Return to VfL Wolfsburg II
Ismaël returned to VfL Wolfsburg II on 1 June 2015. Repeating the success of his first tenure with the team, Wolfsburg II won the 2015–16 Regionalliga Nord. Once again though, Wolfsburg II lost in the promotion play-off, this time to Jahn Regensburg.

VfL Wolfsburg 
First-team head coach Dieter Hecking was sacked on 17 October 2016 and was replaced by Ismaël on an interim basis. In his first four games in charge, Wolfsburg managed to win twice. Ismaël was promoted from interim coach to permanent head coach on 7 November 2016. Ismaël was sacked on 26 February 2017.

Apollon Smyrnis
On 29 May 2018, it was announced that Ismaël had signed a two-year deal with Super League Greece club Apollon Smyrnis. However, after only managing them for one league game against Larissa on 25 August 2018, in which Apollon lost 0–1 at home, he was dismissed from his managerial post six days later due to disagreements with the club's president.

LASK
For the 2019–20 Austrian Football Bundesliga Ismaël was succeeding Oliver Glasner as the new head coach and sporting director of Austrian team LASK. In the first few months of his tenure, he led the team to the best start in the club's history (17 points from 8 games). He also led LASK to a first ever appearance in the UEFA Champions League play-offs. After beating favourites FC Basel the team fell short against Club Brugge. In LASK's first ever appearance in the UEFA Europa League the team won the group with Sporting Lisbon, PSV Eindhoven, and Rosenborg Trondheim. After beating AZ Alkmaar in the round of 32, LASK lost against Manchester United. After the Covid-19 induced pause of football, LASK trained a couple of days too early with full body contact. It was heavily criticised by other clubs, and the media. The team did not play well any more, and 4 points were deducted for breaching the Corona rules, which let them end on fourth position in the league. LASK parted ways with Ismaël on 11 July 2020, as Dominik Thalhammer became available who succeeded him.

Barnsley
When Gerhard Struber decided to join New York Red Bulls in autumn 2020, Barnsley hired Ismaël as his successor. He led them to a play-off position in the 2020-21 EFL Championship.

West Bromwich Albion
On 24 June 2021, Ismaël joined recently relegated Championship side West Bromwich Albion, signing a four-year contract and becoming the club's first French manager. On 2 February 2022, Ismaël left the club by mutual consent after a poor run of form.

Beşiktaş
On 25 March 2022, Ismael became the coach of Turkish club Beşiktaş. Prior to his arrival, the team was temporarily coached by one of the youth coaches, Önder Karaveli. Ismael's contract runs until the end of the 2022–23 season.

Personal life
Ismaël is married to his German wife Karolina. He has a son (born 1995) from his first marriage. On 25 April 2013, Ismaël received German citizenship.

Managerial statistics

Honours

Player
Strasbourg
Coupe de France: 2000–01
Coupe de la Ligue: 1996–97
UEFA Intertoto Cup: 1995

Lens
Coupe de la Ligue: 1998–99

Werder Bremen
Bundesliga: 2003–04
DFB-Pokal: 2003–04

Bayern Munich
Bundesliga: 2005–06
DFB-Pokal: 2005–06

Manager
VfL Wolfsburg II
Regionalliga Nord: 2013–14, 2015–16

References

External links

1975 births
Living people
French footballers
French football managers
1. FC Nürnberg managers
VfL Wolfsburg managers
Apollon Smyrnis F.C. managers
LASK managers
Barnsley F.C. managers
West Bromwich Albion F.C. managers
Beşiktaş J.K. managers
Crystal Palace F.C. players
RC Strasbourg Alsace players
RC Lens players
SV Werder Bremen players
FC Bayern Munich footballers
FC Bayern Munich II players
Hannover 96 players
Expatriate footballers in Germany
Expatriate footballers in England
French expatriate footballers
Footballers from Strasbourg
Premier League players
Bundesliga players
Ligue 1 players
French people of Martiniquais descent
French people of Guadeloupean descent
French people of German descent
French expatriate sportspeople in Austria
French expatriate sportspeople in Germany
French expatriate sportspeople in Greece
French expatriate sportspeople in England
French expatriate football managers
Expatriate football managers in Austria
Expatriate football managers in Germany
Expatriate football managers in Greece
Expatriate football managers in England
Bundesliga managers
Super League Greece managers
Austrian Football Bundesliga managers
English Football League managers
Süper Lig managers
Association football central defenders
Black French sportspeople